Arthur Edward Waite (2 October 1857 – 19 May 1942) was a British poet and scholarly mystic who wrote extensively on occult and esoteric matters, and was the co-creator of the Rider–Waite tarot deck (also called the Rider–Waite–Smith or Waite–Smith deck). As his biographer R. A. Gilbert described him, "Waite's name has survived because he was the first to attempt a systematic study of the history of Western occultism—viewed as a spiritual tradition rather than as aspects of protoscience or as the pathology of religion."

He spent most of his life in or near London, connected to various publishing houses and editing a magazine, The Unknown World.

Early life and education
Arthur Edward Waite was born  on 2 October 1857 in Brooklyn, New York, United States, to unmarried parents. Waite's father, Capt. Charles F. Waite, died at sea when Arthur was very young, and his widowed mother, Emma Lovell, returned to her home country of England, where he was then raised. They were well enough off to educate Waite at a small private school in North London.

When he was 13, he was educated for two terms at St. Charles' College. When he left school to become a clerk he wrote verse in his spare time. In 1863 Waite's mother converted to Catholicism and Arthur was raised a Catholic. The death of his sister Frederika Waite in 1874 soon attracted him into psychical research. At 21, he began to read regularly in the Library of the British Museum, studying many branches of esotericism. In 1881 Waite discovered the writings of Eliphas Levi.

Career

Golden Dawn

Waite joined the Outer Order of the Hermetic Order of the Golden Dawn in January 1891 after being introduced by E.W. Berridge. In 1893 he withdrew from the Golden Dawn. In 1896 he rejoined the Outer Order of the Golden Dawn. In 1899 he entered the Second order of the Golden Dawn. He became a Freemason in 1901, and entered the Societas Rosicruciana in Anglia in 1902.

In 1903 Waite founded the Independent and Rectified Order R. R. et A. C. This Order was disbanded in 1914. The Golden Dawn was torn by internal feuding until Waite's departure in 1914; in July 1915 he formed the Fellowship of the Rosy Cross, not to be confused with the Societas Rosicruciana.  By that time there existed some half-dozen offshoots from the original Golden Dawn, and as a whole it never recovered.

Freemason
Waite was interested in the higher grades of Freemasonry and saw initiation into Craft Masonry as a way to gain access to these rites. After joining the Societas Rosicruciana in Anglia and the Knights Templar, Waite traveled to Switzerland in 1903 to receive the Regime Ecossais et Rectifie or the Rectified Scottish Rite and its grade of Chevalier Bienfaisant de la Cite Sainte (C.B.C.S.). Waite believed that the Rectified Scottish Rite, more than any other Masonic Rite, represented the "Secret Tradition" of mystical spiritual illumination.

Writer and scholar
Waite was an author and many of his works were well received in the esoteric circles of his time, but his lack of academic training is visible in his limitations as a historian and in his belittling of other authors.

He wrote texts on subjects including divination, esotericism, freemasonry, and ceremonial magic, Kabbalism and alchemy; he also translated and reissued several mystical works. He wrote about the Holy Grail, influenced by his friendship with Arthur Machen. A number of his volumes remain in print, including The Book of Ceremonial Magic (1911), The Holy Kabbalah (1929), A New Encyclopedia of Freemasonry (1921), and his edited translation of Eliphas Levi's 1896 Transcendental Magic, its Doctrine and Ritual (1910), having been reprinted in recent years.

Waite also wrote two allegorical fantasy novels, Prince Starbeam (1889) and The Quest of the Golden Stairs (1893), and edited Elfin Music, an anthology of poetry based on English fairy folklore.

Tarot deck

Waite is best known for his involvement with the Rider–Waite tarot deck, first published in 1910, with illustrations by fellow Golden Dawn member Pamela Colman Smith. Waite authored the deck's companion volume, the Key to the Tarot, republished in expanded form in 1911 as the Pictorial Key to the Tarot, a guide to tarot reading. The Rider–Waite tarot was notable for illustrating all 78 cards fully, at a time when only the 22 Major Arcana cards were typically illustrated, with the Sola Busca tarot, 1491, being a notable historical exception. Prior to the publication of this deck, many esoteric tarot readers used the Tarot de Marseille playing card deck. The Rider-Waite deck has gone on to have a large influence on contemporary occult tarot.

Personal life
In 1888, he married Ada Lakeman (also called "Lucasta"), and they had one daughter, Sybil. From 1900 to 1909, Waite earned a living as a manager for Horlicks, the manufacturer of malted milk.

Lucasta died in 1924. In 1933, Waite married Mary Broadbent Schofield.

In popular culture
H. P. Lovecraft's short story "The Thing on the Doorstep" includes a character named Ephraim Waite. According to Robert M. Price, this character was based on A. E. Waite.

Works

 
 
 
 
 
 
 
 
 
 
 
 
 
  Two volumes.

Translations
  Two volumes.

References

Citations

Works cited

Further reading

External links

Short Biography
 
 
 
Works by Arthur Edward Waite at sacred-texts.com (plain text and HTML)
 
 

1857 births
1942 deaths
19th-century British short story writers
19th-century British writers
19th-century occultists
20th-century British writers
20th-century occultists
American emigrants to England
Converts to Roman Catholicism
English fantasy writers
English occult writers
Freemasons of the United Grand Lodge of England
Hermetic Order of the Golden Dawn
20th-century mystics
People from Brooklyn
Tarot readers
Tarotologists
Victorian writers
Writers from New York City